"Tsuki no Uragawa" is the debut single released by DiVA. The single was certified in May 2011 by the RIAJ as gold for physical copies shipped.

Information
"Tsuki no Uragawa" is the debut single released by DiVA. It was released in seven versions: six limited and regular CD+DVD editions (types A, B, and C), and a limited CD-only theater edition. The limited CD+DVD editions came with a debut commemoration event ticket, while the theater edition came with one of four photos and a release commemoration handshake event ticket.

The single was originally scheduled to be released on April 27, but it was postponed until May 18 due to the 2011 Tōhoku earthquake and tsunami.

Track listing

Charts

Oricon Chart

References 

2011 singles
Avex Trax singles
Dance-pop songs
Japanese-language songs
Songs with lyrics by Yasushi Akimoto
2011 songs